Yenimahalle railway station is a railway station in Bakırköy, Istanbul. The station was originally built in 1955 as a stop on the Istanbul suburban commuter rail line until 2013, when the entire line was closed down for expansion and renovation. Yenimahalle station was demolished and a third track was added. The new station entered service on 12 March 2019 and become a stop on the Marmaray commuter rail line.

References

Railway stations in Istanbul Province
Railway stations opened in 1955
1955 establishments in Turkey
Bakırköy
Marmaray